Celso Murilo, born Celso Pereira Levenhagen (9 March 1940, Baependi), is a Brazilian musician, composer and arranger.

Biography
Celso Murilo was born 9 March 1940 in Baependi. He taught himself to play guitar and piano. He moved to Rio de Janeiro in 1959 and was employed by nightclub Arpege, where he worked with João Gilberto, Tom Jobim and others.

Discography
 1959: Mr. Ritmo
 1961: Ritmos Na Passarela
 1964: Tremendo Balanço (as "Celso Murilo e seu conjunto")

Notes and references

External links
 

1940 births
Living people
Musicians from Minas Gerais